Linden Acres is a small hamlet in the town of Red Hook in Dutchess County, New York, United States.  It lies northwest of the Village of Red Hook along the west side of Dutchess County Road 79. 

Linden Acres was built on former apple tree farms, with most house built in the late 1950s and early 1960s.

References

External links
Linden Acres (New York Hometown Locator)

Red Hook, New York
Hamlets in New York (state)
Poughkeepsie–Newburgh–Middletown metropolitan area
Hamlets in Dutchess County, New York